The Rock Music Awards was an annual awards ceremony showcasing the best in rock music that was held from 1975 to 1978. 

During the mid-1970s, the only genre-specific musical awards ceremonies were for country music (where the Nashville-based Country Music Association, West Coast-oriented Academy of Country Music and short-lived Association of Country Entertainers all had competing awards ceremonies at the time). Up to this point, rock music, in its various forms, had been the dominant form of American popular music since overtaking doo-wop in the 1950s; as such, rock songs dominated general music awards such as the Grammy Awards and American Music Awards. By the mid-1970s, however, disco began a rise to mainstream popularity, pushing rock into a niche. The Rock Music Awards were conceived as a way to continue to recognize rock music that was not being recognized due to the rise of disco.

The Rock Music Awards was not able to establish a long-term presence, and the ceremony was not reprised after the third edition.

History

The first annual awards program was produced in the summer of 1975 in Los Angeles by Don Kirshner and featured Elton John and Diana Ross as hosts and presenters.  Winners of the 1975 awards included Elton John as 'Rock Personality of the Year' and The Who's Tommy as 'Rock Movie of the Year.' Linda Ronstadt was awarded the 'Best Rock Female Vocalist' honor, which she would also win the next two years after that. Other winners included The Eagles, Stevie Wonder and Bad Company.

The Second Annual awards show featured Diana Ross and Alice Cooper as hosts and presenters.

The Third Annual awards show featured Olivia Newton-John, pre-Grease, and Peter Frampton at the height of his fame as hosts and presenters.

References

External links
Elton John and Diana Ross host the Rock Music Awards
Tommy wins Rock Music award

American music awards
Awards established in 1975
American annual television specials
1975 establishments in the United States
Rock music awards